A double pipe may be:

The IPA letter used for lateral clicks
Double-walled pipe
Diaulos (instrument)